Gwendolyn Sasse is professor of comparative politics at Nuffield College, University of Oxford. Sasse has research interests in post-communist transitions, comparative democratisation, ethnic conflicts; international conditionality; national minorities; the political behaviour of migrants; diaspora politics, and the political in contemporary art. Since 1 October 2016 Gwendolyn Sasse has been the Director of the Centre for East European and International Studies (ZOiS) in Berlin.

Awards 
Sasse won the Alexander Nove Prize of the British Association for Slavonic & East European Studies for her book The Crimea Question: Identity, Transition, and Conflict (2007).

Selected publications

References

External links 
 Profile page: Prof Gwendolyn Sasse Nuffield College
 Profile page: Prof Gwendolyn Sasse  Department of Politics & International Relations, University of Oxford
 Centre for East European and International Studies (ZOiS), in Berlin, Germany

Fellows of Nuffield College, Oxford
Living people
Year of birth missing (living people)
British political scientists
Women political scientists